Shim Mina (born December 1, 1972), known simply as Mina (미나), is a South Korean singer and dancer. She rose to fame at the World Cup in 2002, eventually deciding to become a K-pop singer.

On July 7, 2018, Mina married Ryu Philip, a member of Kpop boy band Tri:al (트라이얼), formerly known as SoReal (소리얼).

Dancing career
Shim Mina was first a backup dancer for various Korean pop artists such as Park Jin-young and Park Ji-yoon.

Discovery
She initially found instant fame as "Miss World Cup" at the 2002 FIFA World Cup; when pictures of her with the "Be The Reds!" bandanna around her chest and the Korean flag used as a skirt were beamed around the world. Afterwards, she signed a record deal with J-Entercom Entertainment, and prepared to release her debut album.

Music career

2002: Rendezvous
Mina released her debut single 전화받어 ("Answer the Phone") in October 2002. She subsequently released her first album, Rendezvous later in that month.

2004: Re:Turn 2 Mina and departure from J-Entercom Entertainment
After a two-year hiatus, Mina came back with her second album in 2004, titled Re:turn 2 Mina.  She stated at the time that she wanted to be taken seriously as a singer, and no longer wanted to be known as "Miss World Cup". The lead single from the album, 돌아 ("Turn"), was a strong hit for Mina, as it was performed on SBS's Popular Song numerous times, which caused the song to enter the Top 5 of the Korean music charts. Promotion for the album was accompanied by live vocal performances of various songs from the album. This album proved to be more popular than her debut album, and sold many copies.

2006: Signing with EMI Korea, Kiss Kiss, and Fly High
Mina signed with EMI Korea. and released her third album. Kiss Kiss in the fall of 2005 with an even sexier image. Mina trained in Europe to belly dance and made her music video for her title track there as well.  The cover of the Turkish song, though, failed badly, with the album selling less than 10,000 copies.  She has since released an English single for the European market, even going as far as making a MySpace page for the single.  However, she has remained in Korea and promoted her last single Fly High during the 2006 FIFA World Cup as a tribute to the competition that started her career.

2007–present: Minastasia, scandals, hiatus, comeback, and clothing line
In early 2007, EMI Korea announced Mina's 4th album, entitled Minastasia. The album was scheduled to be released in early April; however, the release of Minastasia was delayed until July 2007. In China, the album received an unexpected 180,000 pre-orders, making her a bonafide star in China. In Korea, the album had two singles to date: a song called "Look" featuring Ak'Sent, and  "좋아" (OK) featuring Seungri of the Korean Pop group, Big Bang.  Because of her relatively late debut, Mina initially claimed that she was born in 1978. As rumors of her real age began to spread, Mina eventually admitted that she was born in 1972 and apologized to the public and her fans for lying about it for so long. On November 17, 2008, Mina attended a TV program "JoyDancing" held by Oriental TV, Shanghai, China. She was accused of not respecting the competition with her dance moves (many see the claims as unfair) and finally got 0 points for her dance. Mina shed tears on the stage of the competition. In the fall of 2009, Mina returned to the K-Pop scene with her new single Doh Doh (도도), keeping her sexy image, but having a new electropop sound, rather than the usual R&B sound she has. The new single fared well with critics, and no news of a new album has been released at this time. Mina has also launched a clothing line named Tamina, which is now defunct.

Discography

Albums
Rendezvous (2002)
 Intro
 일났어
 전화받어 (Answer The Phone)
 꿈*은 이루어진다
 월화수목금토일
 Middletro
 버터플라이
 누가봐
 내 멋대로 하겠어
 문제야
 우연
 전화받아 (Old School Mix)

Re:Turn 2 Mina (2004)
 Intro
 짱
 돌아 (Funky Mix)
 때로는
 비밀
 유혹
 후회
 미운오리
 Tequila
 돌아 (Club Mix)
 Outro

Kiss Kiss (2005)
 Concept
 Kiss Kiss
 Come (와바)
 Fall In (My Sunshine)
 Kill Mr.Bond
 Istanbul
 Red
 Sweet Love
 Oh Oh
 Too Hot
 Fake Love (거짓사랑)
 Destiny (운명)
 Kiss Kiss (Hip Hop ver.)

Minastasia 2007
 Intro
 Look (Feat. Ak'sent)
 Player (Feat. Uptown)
 가까이와 (Feat. Jessica)
 취하고 싶어 (Feat. 이승현)
 좋아 (Feat. 이승현)
 그 사람이 아프면 나도 아픕니다
 돌아
 깊이 깊이
 Turn
 Look (Dakey's Hybrid Remix)
 Look (Feat. Ak'sent) (MV Edit)

Singles
"Fly High"
 Fly High
 Fly High (Remix)
 Work It
 Korea Ariba
 Korea Ariba (TV track)
 Korea Ariba (Instrumental)

"좋아 (OK)"
 좋아 (OK) (Original Ver.)
 좋아 (OK) (Remix)
 Look (Dakey Remix)
 좋아 (OK) (Inst.) (Original Ver.)
 좋아 (OK) (Inst.) (Remix)

"Doh Doh (도도)"
 Doh Doh (도도)
 Doh Doh (도도) (Inst.)

Awards

References

External links
 Mina profile in EPG, Korean

1972 births
K-pop singers
Living people
South Korean female idols
South Korean women pop singers
Belly dancers
21st-century South Korean singers
21st-century South Korean women singers